Ni contigo... ni sin ti (English title: With You, Without You) is a Spanish-language Mexican telenovela produced by Mapat L. de Zatarain for Televisa. It premiered on February 28, 2011 and ended on August 26, 2011.

Eduardo Santamarina, Laura Carmine, Erick Elías and Alessandra Rosaldo starred as protagonists, while Andrea Torre, Ricardo Franco and Luz María Jerez starred as antagonists. Sabine Moussier, María Marcela, Otto Sirgo, Ximena Herrera and the leading actresses Luz María Aguilar and Beatriz Aguirre starred as stellar performances.

In the United States it premiered on Univision on October 18, 2011, and ended on April 6, 2012.

Plot 
Leo (Eduardo Santamarina) became blind because of an accident that occurred when he was 15 years old. His personality does not correspond to television stereotypes of disabled persons. On the contrary, Leo is optimistic and happy. Nicole (Laura Carmine) moves into Leo's building after leaving her home town due to the destruction caused by a hurricane.

Leo works selling encyclopedias and teaching Braille at the local museum while Nicole studies design. They meet and fall in love. Nicole works in an exclusive boutique run by Eleonor (Sabine Moussier). Eleonor has a daughter named Veronica (Lili Gorett). Besides having a complicated mother-daughter relationship, they share a secret. Julia (Alessandra Rosaldo) also lives there and is constantly looking for job. Julia is about to marry Octavio (Otto Sirgo), a wealthy, middle-aged man who gets everything his way. She is marrying him out of gratitude because he got her out of a strip club. She meets Iker (Erick Elías), a good-looking young man. There is a misunderstanding between them and Iker feels rejected.

The story tells about other couples, rich and humble. Rich people have a nice house in a district of uptown. Humble people have jobs that provide basic support.

Cast

Main
 Eduardo Santamarina as Leonardo "Leo" Cornejo Fernández
 Laura Carmine as Nicole Lorentti Tinoco de Cornejo
 Erick Elías as Iker Rivas Olmedo
 Alessandra Rosaldo as Julia Mistral de Rivas
 Sabine Moussier as Eleonor Cortázar Armenta de Rivas
 María Marcela as Doña Carola "Caro" Tinoco Vda. de Lorentti
 Andrea Torre as Fabiola Escalante de Rivas
 Ricardo Franco as José Carlos Rivas Olmedo
 Luz María Jerez as Irene Olmedo de Rivas
 Ximena Herrera as Isabela Rivas Olmedo Reyes
 Beatriz Aguirre as Doña Miranda de la Reguera de Fernández

Also main
 César Bono as Don Gelasio Lorentti
 Gaston Tuset as Alejandro Rivas
 Mauricio Mejía as Marco Rábago
 Lili Gorett as Verónica Galindo Cortázar
 Yousi Díaz as Flora Topete
 Jorge Ortín as Don Chuy Turrubiates
 Sharis Cid as Salma Rábago de Chamorro
 Amparo Garrido as Doña Adela "Adelita" Vda. de Chamorro
 Robin Vega as Tobías Marcelino "Tobi" Topete
 Michelle Renaud as Concepción "Cony" Chamorro de Garnica
 Pepe Gamez as Alfonso "Poncho" Chamorro
 Brandon Peniche as Diego Torreslanda
 René Mussi as Eduardo "Lalo" Garnica
 Sachi Tamashiro as Yolanda "Yola" Zorrilla
 Óscar Zamanillo as Bosco Rosado
 Marifer Galindo as Laura
 Maité Valverde as Mary

Special participation
 Graciela Döring as Doña Felipa
 Iliana de la Garza as Refugio "Cuca"
 Beatriz Moreno as Clara Fernández de la Reguera Vda. de Cornejo
 Luz María Aguilar as Doña Natalia Armenta de Cortázar
 Otto Sirgo as Octavio Torreslanda
 José Elías Moreno as Dr. Esteban Lieja
 Luis Gatica as Lawyer of Fabiola

Awards and nominations

TVyNovelas Awards

La Maravilla Awards

TV Adicto Golden Awards

Oye (México) Awards

References

External links 

2011 telenovelas
2011 Mexican television series debuts
2011 Mexican television series endings
Television shows set in Puebla
Mexican telenovelas
Televisa telenovelas
Mexican television series based on Brazilian television series
Spanish-language telenovelas